Baltistan also known as Baltiyul or Little Tibet, is a mountainous region in the Pakistani-administered territory of Gilgit–Baltistan. It is located near the Karakoram (south of K2) and borders Gilgit to the west, China's Xinjiang to the north, Indian-administered Ladakh to the southeast, and the Indian-administered Kashmir Valley to the southwest. Baltistan is largely administered under the Baltistan Division.

Prior to the partition of British India in 1947, Baltistan was part of the princely state of Jammu and Kashmir, having been conquered by Gulab Singh's armies in 1840. Baltistan and Ladakh were administered jointly under one wazarat (district) of the state. The region retained its identity in this setup as the Skardu tehsil, with Kargil and Leh being the other two tehsils of the district. After Hari Singh, the last maharaja of Jammu and Kashmir, acceded to the Dominion of India in 1947, his local governor in Gilgit was overthrown by the Gilgit Scouts, who then took the entire region for Pakistan during the Indo-Pakistani War of 1947–1948; the Gilgit Agency and Baltistan have since been under Pakistani governance while the Kashmir Valley and the Kargil and Leh tehsils remain under Indian governance. However, four small rugged and dried mountainous villages, including the village of Turtuk in the Nubra Valley, have been under Indian control since 1971, when they were all incorporated into the erstwhile state of Jammu and Kashmir (now in Ladakh) after being captured by India during the Indo-Pakistani War of 1971.

The region is inhabited primarily by the Balti people, a largely Muslim ethnic group of Tibetan descent. Baltistan is strategically significant to both Pakistan and India; the Siachen conflict and the Kargil War took place in this region alongside others.

Geography 

The 1911 Encyclopaedia Britannica characterises Baltistan as the western extremity of Tibet, whose natural limits are the Indus River from its abrupt southward bend around the map point  and the mountains to the north and west. These features separate a comparatively peaceful Tibetan population from the Indo-Aryan tribes to the west. Muslim writers around the 16th century speak of Baltistan as the "Little Tibet", and of Ladakh as the "Great Tibet", emphasising their ethnological similarity. According to Ahmad Hassan Dani, Baltistan spreads upwards from the Indus river and is separated from Ladakh by the Siachen Glacier. It includes the Indus valley and the lower valley of the Shyok river.

Baltistan is a rocky mass of lofty mountains, the prevailing formation being gneiss.

The main inhabitable valleys of Kharmang Khaplu, Skardu and Roundu are along the routes of these rivers.

Administration 
The Baltistan is one of three divisions of Gilgit-Baltistan. The Division of Baltistan is administrative under a Commissioner of BPS-20 belonging to Pakistan Administrative Service group of Central Superior Services of Pakistan. The Current Commissioner Baltistan Division is Mr Shula Alam (PAS).

Valleys and districts

°Although under Indian control since 1971, geographically, the Turtuk part of Shyok Valley, is part of Baltistan region.

History

Origins 

Today, the people of Kharmang and Western Khaplu have Tibetan features and those in Skardu, Shigar and the eastern villages of Khaplu are Dards. It was believed that the Balti people were in the sphere of influence of Zhangzhung. Baltistan was controlled by the Tibetan king in 686. Culturally influenced by Tibet, the Bon and animist Baltis began to adopt Tibetan Buddhism. Religious artifacts such as gompas and stupas were built, and lamas played an important role in Balti life.

For centuries, Baltistan consisted of small, independent valley states connected by the blood relationships of its rulers (rajas), trade, common beliefs and cultural and linguistic bonds. Baltistan was known as Little Tibet, and the name was extended to include Ladakh. Ladakh later became known as Great Tibet. Locally, Baltistan is known as Baltiyul and Ladakh and Baltistan are known as Maryul ("red country").

In 1190, Maqpon dynasty of Skardu was founded by Ibrahim Shah (1190-1220), who was born in Skardu. This royal family ruled over Baltistan for approximately 700 years.  The kings of the Maqpon dynasty extended the frontiers of Baltistan to Gilgit Agency, Chitral, and Ladakh.

During the 14th century, Muslim scholars from Kashmir crossed Baltistan's mountainous terrain to spread Islam. The Noorbakshia Sufi order further propagated the faith in Baltistan and Islam became dominant by the end of the 17th century. With the passage of time a large number also converted to Shia Islam and a few converted to Sunni Islam.

The Kharmang came under the control of the Namgyal royal family and developed a close relationship with Ladakh when the raja of Ladakh, Jamyang Mangyal, attacked the principalities in Kargil. Mangyal annihilated the Skardu garrison at Kharbu and put to the sword a number of petty Muslim rulers in the principalities of Purik (Kargil). Ali Sher Khan Anchan, raja of Khaplu and Shigar, left with a strong army via Marol. Passing the Laddakhi army, he occupied Leh (the capital of Ladakh) and the raja of Ladakh was taken prisoner.

Ali Sher Khan Anchan included Gilgit and Chitral in his kingdom of Baltistan, reportedly a flourishing country. The valley from Khepchne to Kachura was flat and fertile, with abundant fruit trees; the sandy desert now extending from Sundus to Skardu Airport was a prosperous town. Skardu had hardly recovered from the shock of the death of Anchan when it was flooded.

In 1845, the region was subjugated by the Dogra rulers of Kashmir. 
On 29 August 2009 the government of Pakistan announced the creation of Gilgit–Baltistan, a provincial autonomous region with Gilgit as its capital and Skardu its largest city.

Tourism 

Skardu has several tourist resorts and many natural features, including plains, mountains and mountain-valley lakes. The Deosai plain, Satpara Lake and Basho also host tourists. North of Skardu, the Shigar Valley offers plains, hiking tracks, peaks and campsites. Other valleys in Baltistan region are Khaplu, Rondu, Kachura Lake and Kharmang.

Glaciers 
The Himalayas advance into this region from India, Tibet and Nepal, and north of them are the Karakoram range. Both ranges run northwest, separated by the Indus River. Along the Indus and its tributaries are many valleys. Glaciers include Baltoro Glacier, Biafo Glacier, Siachen Glacier, Trango Glacier and Godwin-Austen Glacier.

Mountaineering 

Other well-known peaks include Masherbrum (also known as K1), Broad Peak, Hidden Peak, Gasherbrum II, Gasherbrum IV and Chogolisa (in the Khaplu Valley). The following peaks have been scaled:

Demographics 
The region has a population of about 303,214 as of 2017. It is a blend of ethnic groups, predominantly Baltis, and Tibetans. A few Kashmiris settled in Skardu, practicing agriculture and woodcraft.

Religion 
Before the arrival of Islam, Tibetan Buddhism and Bön (to a lesser extent) were the main religions in Baltistan. Buddhism can be traced back to before the formation of the Tibetan Empire in the region during the seventh century. The region has a number of surviving Buddhist archaeological sites. These include the Manthal Buddha Rock, a rock relief of the Buddha at the edge of the village (near Skardu) and the Sacred Rock of Hunza. Nearby are former sites of Buddhist shelters.

Islam was brought to Baltistan by Sufi missionaries during the 16th and 17th centuries, and most of the population converted to Noorbakshia Islam. The scholars were followers of the Kubrawiya Sufi order. Most Noorbakhshi Muslims live in Ghanche and Shigar districts, and 30 percent live in the Skardu district.

Fauna 

Baltistan has been called a living museum for wildlife. Deosai National Park, in the southern part of the region, is habitat for predators since it has an abundant prey population. Domestic animals include yaks (including hybrid yaks), cattle, sheep, goats, horses and donkeys. Wild animals include ibex, markhor, musk deer, snow leopards, brown and black bears, jackals, foxes, wolves and marmots.

Culture

Balti music and art 

According to Balti folklore, Mughal princess Gul Khatoon (known in Baltistan as Mindoq Gialmo—Flower Queen) brought musicians and artisans with her into the region and they propagated Mughal music and art under her patronage. Musical instruments such as the surnai, karnai, dhol and chang were introduced into Baltistan.

Dance 
Classical and other dances are classified as sword dances, broqchhos and Yakkha and ghazal dances. Chhogho Prasul commemorates a victory by the Maqpon rajas. As a mark of respect, the musician who plays the drum (dang) plays for a long time. A Maqpon princess would occasionally dance to this tune. Gasho-Pa, also known as Ghbus-La-Khorba, is a sword dance associated with the Gasho Dynasty of Purik (Kargil). Sneopa, the marriage-procession dance by pachones (twelve wazirs who accompany the bride), is performed at the marriage of a raja.

Architecture 

Balti architecture has Tibetan and Mughul influences, and its monastic architecture reflects the Buddhist imprint left on the region. Buddhist-style wall paintings can be seen in forts and Noorbakhshi khanqahs, including Chaqchan Mosque in Khaplu, Amburik Mosque in Shigar, Khanqah e Muallah Shigar, Khaplu Fort, Shigar Fort and Skardu Fort.

Polo 

Polo is popular in Baltistan, and indigenous to the Karakoram region, having been played there since at least the 15th–16th century. The Maqpon ruler Ali Sher Khan Anchan introduced the game to other valleys during his conquests beyond Gilgit and Chitral. The English word polo derives from the Balti word polo, meaning "the ball used in the game of polo". The game of polo itself is called shagran in Balti.

Media
The Pakistan Broadcasting Corporation has radio and television stations in Khaplu that broadcast local programs, and there are a handful of private news outlets. The Daily K2 is an Urdu newspaper published in Skardu serving Gilgit-Baltistan for long time, and it is the pioneer of print media in Gilgit Baltisatn. Bad-e-Shimal claims the largest daily circulation in Gilgit and Baltistan. Nawa-e-Sufia is a monthly magazine covering Baltistan's Nurbakshi sect.

See also
 Gilgit-Baltistan
 Balti people
 Balti language

Notes

Bibliography

External links

 www.pakistantoursguide.pk
 Britannica Baltistan.

Baltistan
Regions of Gilgit-Baltistan
Divided regions
Regions of Pakistan
Former kingdoms